Margaret Easley is an American actress and television writer and producer.

Early life
Easley received an Associate of Arts degree from Santa Barbara City College and a Bachelor of Arts in English from the University of California, Santa Barbara.

Career
She has worked in the theater, television and films and voice-overs and commercials. She has done commercials for Home Depot, McDonald's and DirecWay. She is alum of The Groundlings.

She also works as a screenwriter and television producer, contributing to The Mysteries of Laura, Life Sentence and Manifest.

Filmography

Acting
 Assassin's Creed Valhalla (2020) (Videogame) — Gunlod
 The Listing Agent (2014) (Short film) — Wendy Brown
 Infamous Second Son  (2014) (Videogame) — Female pedestrian
 Modern Family ("The Wow Factor", 2013) — Rachel
 The Thundermans (2013) - Fiona Campbell
 Assassin's Creed III (2012) (Videogame) — Minerva
 Starhawk (2012) (Videogame) — Automated Voice, Crowd
 iCarly (2011)  — Mrs. Dershlit 
 The Closer (2010) — Joan Marku
 Assassin's Creed II (2009) (Videogame) — Minerva
 Marvel: Ultimate Alliance 2 (2009) (Videogame) — Maria Hill
 90210 (2009) — Sister Mary Elisabeth
 Me, You, a Bag & Bamboo (2009) (Short film) — Clifford's Mother
 Sizzle: A Global Warming Comedy (2008) — Janet Sanders
 Ghost Whisperer (2008) — Brenda
 Lost: Via Domus (2008) (Videogame) — Juliet Burke
 Moonlight (2008) — Dr Alison Lin
 Dan's Detour of Life (2008) (TV movie) — Caroline Kirkland
 Neverwinter Nights 2: Mask of the Betrayer (2007) (Videogame) — Katya, Kazimika Vadoi, NPC Female Merchant
 NCIS (2007) — Sara Nelson
 Big Love (2006–2010) — April Blessing
 Driver '76 (2007)  (Videogame) — Mrs Thompson
 Andy Barker, P.I. (2007) — Wendy Halverson
 The Singles Table (2007) — Makeup Artist
 Family Guy (2005–2006) — Various, Hand #2 (voices)
 Neverwinter Nights 2 (2006) (Videogame) — Katya, Kazimika Vadoi
 Cold Case (2006) — Stella Bobker
 Studio 60 on the Sunset Strip (2006) — Constance Gower
 Pepper Dennis (2006) — Alice
 The King of Queens (2006) — Nancy
 The Night of the Falcon (2005) (Short film) — Margaret
 Mrs. Harris (2005) (TV movie) — Carol Potts
 Alias (2005) — Tammy Miller/Yelena Vasya
 Peep Show (2005) (TV movie) — Erin
 Huff (2004) — Sheila Connelly
 Without a Trace (2004) — Sonya Trammel
 Six Feet Under (2004)  — Young Woman in Elevator
 Scrubs (2004) — J.D.'s Mother
 The D.A. (2004) — Laura Rainer
 The District (2004) — Katherine Lustig
 24 (2004) — President's Aide
 What I Like About You (2003)  — Martha
 Looney Tunes: Stranger Than Fiction (2003) (Video) — Additional voices
 Looney Tunes: Reality Check (2003) (Video) — Additional voices
 June & Orlando (2003) (Short film) — Amanda
 Gilmore Girls (2003) — Helen Thompson
 Less than Perfect (2003)  — Cassidy
 Slackers (2002) — Receptionist
 Passions (2001)  — Nora Randall
 Charmed (2001)  — News Director
 Once and Again (2001) — Marlys
 We Married Margo (2000) — Woman Dumped By Margo
 Buffy the Vampire Slayer (1999) — Curator
 Introducing Dorothy Dandridge (1999) (TV movie) — Ring-a-ding Girl
 Sunset Beach (1997) — Stewardess

Writing
 Manifest (2018-2021)
 Life Sentence (2018)
 Lethal Weapon (2017)
 The Mysteries of Laura (2014-2016)

References

External links

American stage actresses
American film actresses
American television actresses
American television writers
American women television writers
American voice actresses
Place of birth missing (living people)
Living people
Year of birth missing (living people)
Women science fiction and fantasy writers
21st-century American women writers